The Mount Edgecombe Trophy was a golf tournament that was played on the Sunshine Tour. Formed in 1993, it included a deep international field of not only Africans, but drawing names like Vijay Singh, whose best finish in the event was a tie for 3rd in 1993. It was one of the richest purses on the Sunshine Tour at the time with a first place winners share of R 71,100. The inaugural champion was Retief Goosen. The 1994 champion was Bruce Vaughan, the first American to win the event.

Winners

References

Former Sunshine Tour events
Golf tournaments in South Africa